"It's Gonna Take a Little Bit Longer" is a song written by Ben Peters, and recorded by American country music artist Charley Pride.  It was released in May 1972 as the first single from the album A Sunshiny Day with Charley Pride.  The song was Pride's ninth number one on the country chart.  The single stayed at number one for three weeks and spent a total of fourteen weeks on the country chart.

Charts

References

1972 singles
1972 songs
Charley Pride songs
Songs written by Ben Peters
Song recordings produced by Jack Clement
RCA Records singles